Matilda Helen Rachel Thorpe is a British actress. Matilda Thorpe was born on May 1, 1960 in Wood Green, London, England. Thorpe trained at London's Central School of Speech and Drama. She is known for her roles in the British sitcoms, Mandy in the Channel 4 sitcoms Desmond's (1989–94)  and Porkpie (1995–96), and Sick Note (2017–18) for Sky One.

Career
Thorpe is the daughter of the writers Gillian Freeman and Edward Thorpe. She is married to comedian Gary Spinks and mother of actors Sam Thorpe-Spinks and Henry Thorpe-Spinks.

Thorpe's television appearances include Amanda in Gems (1986), Narrator in Pinny's House (1986), Friend in Murder Most Horrid (1991), Jane in The Upper Hand (1992), Mandy Mosgrove in Desmond's (1989–1994), Mandy Ambrose in Porkpie (1995–1996), Mother in How to Be a Little Sod (1995), Keeping Mum (1997), Barbara Robertson in The Jump (1998), Sarah Johnson in Casualty (1998), Personnel Officer in Wonderful You (1999), Inspector Shaw in Bad Girls (2002), Marcia Heyman in Holby City (2003), Marianne Wild in Doctors (2004), Sue Jenner in The Bill (2005), Receptionist in Rosemary & Thyme (2006), Mary in Robin Hood (2006) and Rupert Grint's mother, Claire Glass in 2 series of Sick Note (2017–18).

Her film roles include Queen of Hearts (1989), Stationer in Crush (2001), and Andrea in Not Another Happy Ending (2013).

Stage appearances include It's a Girl (Winner Time Out Best Musical) (1989) and When We Are Married (Winner Olivier Award Best Comedy) at the Garrick Theatre (2010). She was a member of the 'Dogs on Holiday' comedy improvisation team at the Hurricane Club in London's West End for 10 years, who famously performed alongside Robin Williams, among others.

References

External links
Thorpe on the csa website
Interview with Thorpe on 'The Lights Go Out' website

1960 births
Living people
English television actresses
English film actresses
English stage actresses
People from Wood Green